Kilcolgan, is a village on the mouth of the Kilcolgan River at Dunkellin Bay in County Galway, Ireland. The settlement is at the junction of the N67 and R458 roads, which lies between Gort and Clarinbridge. The village is near the site of the Galway Bay drowning tragedy. Kilcolgan was designated as a census town by the Central Statistics Office for the first time in the 2016 census, at which time it had a population of 141 people.

Places of interest
 Tyrone House, a ruined manor house
 Kilcolgan Bridge, late 18th-century stone bridge
 Kilcolgan Castle, Gothic Revival country house
 St Sourney (Sairnait)'s church and well, a religious site dating from the 6th Century with an 11th-century gothic carved doorway, a 19th-century mausoleum (celebrated by the British poet Sir John Betjeman) and adjoining graveyard.
 Moran's Oyster Cottage, historic restaurant located in a traditional thatched cottage, established in the 1760s.
 Kiltiernan Church, medieval church and a National Monument

See also
 Galway Bay
 List of abbeys and priories in the Republic of Ireland#County Galway
 List of towns and villages in Ireland

References

Towns and villages in County Galway